Maria Machava (born 17 August 2004) is a Mozambican sailor. She competed in the women's 470 event at the 2020 Summer Olympics.

References

External links
 

2004 births
Living people
Mozambican female sailors (sport)
Olympic sailors of Mozambique
Sailors at the 2020 Summer Olympics – 470
Place of birth missing (living people)